Rudolf Wöber (10 November 1911 – 14 February 1982) was an Austrian long-distance runner. He competed in the marathon at the 1936 Summer Olympics.

References

External links

1911 births
1982 deaths
Athletes (track and field) at the 1936 Summer Olympics
Austrian male long-distance runners
Austrian male marathon runners
Olympic athletes of Austria
Place of birth missing